Validabad (also Romanized as Valīdābād) is a village in Jereh, in the Jereh and Baladeh of Kazerun County, Fars Province, Iran. At the 2016 census, its population was 90, in 26 families.

References 

Populated places in Kazerun County